Chess strategy and tactics may refer to:
Chess strategy—long-term plans in chess
Chess tactics—short-term plans in chess